The Federal Oil Conservation Board (FOCB) was created by United States president Calvin Coolidge in 1924 to investigate conditions in the oil industry. It was superseded by the Petroleum Administrative Board in 1934.

References

Further reading

External links 

 Records of the Federal Oil Conservation Board at the National Archives

1924 establishments in the United States
1934 disestablishments in the United States
Defunct agencies of the United States government
Petroleum in the United States
United States federal boards, commissions, and committees